Disco4 (stylized DISCO4) is the fifth studio album by American noise rock band Health. A double album focused on collaborative pieces, it was released in two parts: DISCO4 :: PART I on October 16, 2020, and DISCO4 :: PART II on April 8th, 2022. PART I also received a remix album, titled DISCO4+, on August 20th, 2021 (though it also contains remixes of songs from the band's previous album,  VOL 4 :: SLAVES OF FEAR). PART I and PART II are also to be released as a combined set called DISCO4 :: Generations. All of these were released through Loma Vista Recordings. Speaking on the album, the band said: "In the past each HEALTH LP has been accompanied by a corresponding remix record, this time, despite being called DISCO 4 in the interest of continuity, we offer you a collection of original collaborations with artists we admire. Also, FUCK 2020." The album is notable for having been made over years; some of the collaborations, like "HATE YOU" with JPEGMafia, "DELICIOUS APE" with Xiu Xiu, and "MASS GRAVE" with Soccer Mommy were previously released, however it includes new tracks like "POWER FANTASY" with 100 Gecs and two new, non-collaborative songs, "CYBERPUNK 2.0.2.0." and "STRANGE DAYS 2.0.2.1.".

The name of the song "CYBERPUNK 2.0.2.0." is likely based on the tabletop game of the same name, Cyberpunk 2020, since Health made an appearance on the soundtrack of its then-upcoming video game adaptation, Cyberpunk 2077. An original song by the band, "Major Crimes", plays on an in-game radio station, but all contributing artists have taken on pseudonyms for the Cyberpunk world, with Health's being Window Weather.

The album was generally well-received, with KEXP saying "The album coheres surprisingly well, with the sound being a dark, ominous blend of industrial, noise-rock, metal, and electronic styles." According to the North American College and Community Radio Chart Top 200 charts PART I peaked at 29 the week of November 10th.

Track listing

DISCO4 :: PART I

DISCO4+

DISCO4 :: PART II

References

2020 albums
Health (band) albums
Loma Vista Recordings albums